The Arizona Wildcats men's basketball team was founded in 1904 to represent the University of Arizona in intercollegiate competition and has participated in the sport all but one season since its inception. Over the course of the team's history, the Wildcats' performance has ranged from losing records to resulting in a national championship.

During periods of both ascendancy and mediocrity, individual Arizona players of exceptional ability have received various accolades. In total, Wildcats have been named to an All-America team 31 times, and All-Pac-12 Conference team 110 times. Of the All-America selections, thirty-seven players received first-team honors a total of fifty-eight times. Sixteen players were named consensus first-team All-Americans a total of twenty-five times.

Wildcats have won several nationally recognized individual awards, including the Bob Cousy Award, the Senior CLASS Award, Academic All-America of the Year, and several of the National Player of the Year awards. The College Basketball Hall of Fame has inducted one former Arizona player, and the Naismith Memorial Basketball Hall of Fame has enshrined three. Former Wildcats head coach have also been inducted into the College Basketball Hall of Fame.

All-Americans

Each year, numerous publications and organizations release lists of All-America teams, hypothetical rosters of players considered the best in the nation at their respective positions. Some selecting organizations choose more than one roster of All-Americans, in which case they use the terms "first team", "second team", and "third team" as appropriate. Some selectors also award honorable mentions to outstanding players who did not make any of their teams. The National Collegiate Athletic Association (NCAA), a college sports governing body, uses officially recognized All-America selectors to determine the "consensus" selections. To earn "consensus" status, a player must win honors based on a point system computed from the four different all-America teams. The point system consists of three points for first team, two points for second team and one point for third team. No honorable mention or fourth team or lower are used in the computation.  The top five totals plus ties are first team and the next five plus ties are second team. Over time, the sources used to determine the consensus selections have changed, and since 1997, the NCAA has used these selectors to determine consensus All-Americans: Associated Press (AP), the United States Basketball Writers Association (USBWA), the Sporting News (TSN), and the National Association of Basketball Coaches (NABC).

The following is a list of Arizona Wildcats men's basketball players that were named first, second or third team All-Americans:

Consensus All-Americans

 1951 – Roger Johnson
 1976 – Bob Elliott
 1977 – Bob Elliott (2)
 1988 – Sean Elliott (Consensus)
 1988 – Steve Kerr
 1989 – Sean Elliott (2, Consensus)
 1992 – Sean Rooks
 1993 – Chris Mills
 1994 – Khalid Reeves (Consensus)
 1995 – Damon Stoudamire (Consensus)
 1997 – Michael Dickerson
 1998 – Mike Bibby (Consensus)
 1998 – Michael Dickerson (2)
 1998 – Miles Simon (Consensus)
 1999 – Jason Terry (Consensus)
 2000 – Loren Woods
 2000 – Michael Wright
 2001 – Loren Woods (2)
 2001 – Michael Wright (2)
 2002 – Jason Gardner
 2002 – Luke Walton
 2003 – Jason Gardner (Consensus)
 2003 – Andre Iguodala
 2005 – Salim Stoudamire (Consensus)
 2009 – Jordan Hill
 2011 – Derrick Williams (Consensus)
 2014 – Nick Johnson (Consensus)
 2014 – Aaron Gordon
 2015 – Stanley Johnson (3rd-Team, NABC)
 2017 – Lauri Markkanen (3rd-Team, AP, USA Today, Sporting News, NBC Sports)
 2018 – Deandre Ayton (Consensus)
 2022 – Bennedict Mathurin (2nd-Team, AP, Sporting News)

Source: Arizona 2029–21 Media Guide

Fourteen Arizona players have received AP All-America honorable mention:

 1991 – Chris Mills (AP Honorable Mention)
 1991 – Brian Williams (AP Honorable Mention)
 1992 – Chris Mills (2) (AP Honorable Mention)
 1992 – Sean Rooks (AP Honorable Mention)
 1994 – Damon Stoudamire (AP Honorable Mention, Basketball Weekly, USBWA)
 1997 – Michael Dickerson (AP Honorable Mention)
 2000 – Loren Woods (AP Honorable Mention)
 2000 – Michael Wright (AP Honorable Mention)
 2001 – Jason Gardner (AP Honorable Mention)
 2001 – Loren Woods (2) (AP Honorable Mention)
 2003 – Luke Walton (AP Honorable Mention)
 2004 – Andre Iguodala (AP Honorable Mention)
 2009 – Chase Budinger (AP Honorable Mention)
 2018 – Allonzo Trier (AP Honorable Mention)

All-Pac-12 Conference
The following is a list of Arizona Wildcats men's basketball players that were named first, second or third team All-Pac-12:

First team All-Pac-12

 1979 – Larry Demic
 1980 – Joe Dehls (2)
 1981 – Ron Davis
 1984 – Pete Williams
 1985 – Pete Williams (2)
 1985 – Eddie Smith
 1986 – Steve Kerr
 1987 – Sean Elliott
 1988 – Sean Elliott (2)‡
 1988 – Steve Kerr (2)
 1988 – Anthony Cook
 1989 – Sean Elliott (3)‡
 1989 – Anthony Cook (2)
 1990 – Jud Buechler
 1991 – Brian Williams
 1992 – Chris Mills
 1992 – Sean Rooks
 1993 – Damon Stoudamire
 1993 – Chris Mills (2)‡
 1994 – Khalid Reeves
 1994 – Damon Stoudamire (2)
 1995 – Ray Owes
 1995 – Damon Stoudamire (3)‡
 1996 – Ben Davis
 1996 – Reggie Geary
 1997 – Michael Dickerson
 1998 – Mike Bibby‡
 1998 – Michael Dickerson (2)
 1998 – Miles Simon
 1999 – A.J. Bramlett
 1999 – Jason Terry‡
 2000 – Jason Gardner
 2000 – Michael Wright
 2000 – Loren Woods
 2001 – Gilbert Arenas
 2001 – Michael Wright (2)
 2002 – Jason Gardner (2)
 2002 – Luke Walton
 2003 – Jason Gardner (3)
 2003 – Luke Walton (2)
 2004 – Channing Frye
 2004 – Andre Iguodala
 2005 – Channing Frye (2)
 2005 – Salim Stoudamire
 2006 – Hassan Adams
 2007 – Marcus Williams
 2009 – Jordan Hill
 2010 – Derrick Williams
 2011 – Derrick Williams (2)‡
 2012 – Kyle Fogg
 2012 – Solomon Hill
 2013 – Solomon Hill (2)
 2014 – Aaron Gordon
 2014 – Nick Johnson‡
 2015 – Rondae Hollis-Jefferson
 2015 – Stanley Johnson
 2015 – T. J. McConnell
 2016 – Ryan Anderson
 2017 – Lauri Markkanen
 2018 – Deandre Ayton‡
 2018 – Allonzo Trier
 2020 – Zeke Nnaji
 2020 - Josh Green
 2021 – James Akinjo
 2022 - Christian Koloko
 2022 - Bennedict Mathurin‡
 2022 - Ąžuolas Tubelis

Second team All-Pac-12

 1979 – Joe Dehls
 2008 – Jerryd Bayless
 2009 – Nic Wise
 2014 – T. J. McConnell
 2016 – Kaleb Tarczewski
 2016 – Gabe York
 2017 – Allonzo Trier
 2017 – Kadeem Allen
 2018 – Dušan Ristić
 2020 – Nico Mannion

Third team All-Pac-12
 2008 – Chase Budinger

Note
‡ indicates player was Pac-12 Player of the Year.

Pac-12 All Freshman Team 

 1984 – Michael Tait
 1986 – Sean Elliott ‡
 1989 – Sean Rooks
 1989 – Matt Othick
 1990 – Ed Stokes
 1991 – Khalid Reeves
 1992 – Damon Stoudamire
 1997 – Mike Bibby ‡
 1999 – Richard Jefferson
 1999 – Michael Wright ‡
 2000 – Gilbert Arenas
 2000 – Jason Gardner
 2002 – Channing Frye
 2002 – Salim Stoudamire ‡
 2003 – Hassan Adams
 2003 – Andre Iguodala
 2004 – Mustafa Shakur
 2006 – Marcus Williams
 2007 – Chase Budinger ‡
 2008 – Jerryd Bayless
 2010 – Derrick Williams ‡
 2012 – Nick Johnson
 2014 – Aaron Gordon‡
 2014 – Rondae Hollis-Jefferson
 2015 – Stanley Johnson‡
 2016 – Allonzo Trier
 2017 – Lauri Markkanen
 2017 – Rawle Alkins
 2018 – Deandre Ayton‡
 2020 – Zeke Nnaji‡
 2020 – Nico Mannion

Note
‡ indicates player was Pac-12 Freshman of the Year.

Pac-12 All Newcomer

 1995 – Ben Davis Jr.
 1997 – Bennett Davison Jr.
 2000 – Loren Woods ‡

Note
‡ indicates player was Pac-12 Newcomer of the Year

Pac-12 All-Defensive Team

 2009 – Jordan Hill
 2012 – Kyle Fogg
 2014 – Nick Johnson
 2014 – T. J. McConnell
 2015 – Rondae Hollis-Jefferson
 2015 – T. J. McConnell
 2016 – Kaleb Tarczewski
 2017 – Kadeem Allen
 2018 – Deandre Ayton
 2022 - Christian Koloko‡
 2022 - Dalen Terry 

Pac-12 All-Academic Team

 1986 – Steve Kerr
 1988 – Steve Kerr (2)
 1989 – Matt Muehlebach
 1990 – Matt Muehlebach (2)
 1991 – Matt Muehlebach (3)
 1994 – Kevin Flanagan
 2001 – Eugene Edgerson
 2004 – Jason Ranne‡
 2004 – Andre Iguodala^
 2004 – Brett Brielmaier‡
 2019 – Chase Jeter‡
 2020 – Stone Gettings‡

All-Pac 12 Tournament Team
1988 - Sean Rooks
1988 - Steve Kerr
1988 - Anthony Cook
1989 - Sean Rooks (2)
1989 - Jud Buechler
1989 - Anthony Cook
1990 - Jud Buechler (2)
1990 - Matt Muehlebach
2002 - Luke Walton
2004 - Hassan Adams 
2005 - Salim Stoudamire
2005 - Channing Frye
2011 - Derrick Williams
2012 - Kyle Fogg
2012 - Solomon Hill
2012 - Jesse Perry
2014 - Aaron Gordon
2014 - Nick Johnson
2015 - Brandon Ashley
2015 - Rondae Hollis-Jefferson
2015 - Stanley Johnson
2015 - T. J. McConnell
2017 - Allonzo Trier
2017 - Lauri Markkanen
2018 - Deandre Ayton
2018 - Dusan Ristic
2022 - Bennedict Mathurin
2022 - Christian Koloko 

Note
‡ indicates player was Pac-12 Defensive Player of the Year

Source: Arizona 2020–21 Media Guide

Award Recipients

Players
John R. Wooden Award
 1989 – Sean Elliott

National player of the year
 1989 – Sean Elliott
 1997 – Mike Bibby
 1999 – Jason Terry
 2000 – Jason Gardner

Frank Hessler Award
 2000 – Loren Woods

NCAA Regionals most outstanding player
 1997 – Miles Simon

Wayman Tisdale Award
 2000 – Jason Gardner

Julius Erving Award
 2015 – Stanley Johnson

Karl Malone Award
 2018 – DeAndre Ayton

Pac-12 player of the year (AP, UPI, Coaches)

The following is a list of Arizona Wildcats men's basketball players who have been named Pac-12 Player of the Year:

 1988 – Sean Elliott
 1989 – Sean Elliott
 1993 – Chris Mills
 1995 – Damon Stoudamire
 1998 – Mike Bibby
 1999 – Jason Terry
 2011 – Derrick Williams
 2014 – Nick Johnson
 2018 – Deandre Ayton
 2022 - Bennedict Mathurin

Pac-12 freshman of the year (AP, Coaches)

The following is a list of Arizona Wildcats men's basketball players who have been named either Pac-12 Freshman of the Year (awarded by the league's head coaches, and open only to freshmen) or Pac-12 Newcomer of the Year (awarded by the AP and open to any player in his first year at an Pac-12 school, including transfers).
 1986 – Sean Elliott
 1997 – Mike Bibby
 1999 – Michael Wright
 2002 – Salim Stoudamire
 2007 – Chase Budinger
 2010 – Derrick Williams
 2014 – Aaron Gordon
 2015 – Stanley Johnson
 2018 – Deandre Ayton
 2020 – Zeke Nnaji

Pac-12 6th Man of the Year
 2021 – Jordan Brown
 2022 – Pelle Larsson

Pac-12 Defensive Player of the Year
 2022 – Christian Koloko

Pac-12 Most Improved Player of the Year
 2022 – Christian Koloko

Pac-12 Scholar Athlete of the Year
 2020: Stone Gettings

Pac-12 Tournament MOPs
 1988: Sean Elliott
 1989: Sean Elliott (2)
 1990: Jud Buechler
 2002: Luke Walton
 2005: Salim Stoudamire
 2015: Brandon Ashley
 2017: Allonzo Trier
 2018: Deandre Ayton
 2022: Bennedict Mathurin

Coaches

National Coach of the Year
 Lute Olson – 1988, 1990

AP Coach of the Year
 Tommy Lloyd – 2022 (AP Coach of the Year)

NABC Coach of the Year
 Tommy Lloyd – 2022(NABC Coach of the Year)

USBWA Coach of the Year
 Tommy Lloyd – 2022(USBWA Coach of the Year)

WAC Coach of the Year
 Fred Snowden – 1972

John R. Wooden Legends of Coaching Award
 Lute Olson – 2002

Clair Bee Coach of the Year Award
 Lute Olson – 2001

Pac-12 Coach of the Year
 Lute Olson – 1986
 Lute Olson – 1988
 Lute Olson – 1989
 Lute Olson – 1993
 Lute Olson – 1994
 Lute Olson – 1998
 Lute Olson – 2003
 Sean Miller – 2011
 Sean Miller – 2014
 Sean Miller – 2017
 Tommy Lloyd - 2022

Hall of Fame inductees
The National Collegiate Basketball Hall of Fame has commemorated many of the sport's most outstanding and most innovative personalities. Among them are one former Arizona players and one former Arizona head coaches.

College Basketball Hall of Fame
Players
 Sean Elliott (2018)
Coaches
 Lute Olson (2002, 2006)

Retired numbers
To have his number retired, a player must win one of the following six widely recognized player of the year awards:
Associated Press Player of the Year
Oscar Robertson Trophy, formerly known as the United States Basketball Writers Association National Player of the Year
National Association of Basketball Coaches Player of the Year
Sporting News Player of the Year
John R. Wooden Award
Naismith College Player of the Year
NCAA basketball tournament Most Outstanding Player
USBWA National Freshman of the Year

Players:
 #10 Mike Bibby (1996–98)
 #22 Jason Gardner (1999–03)
 #25 Steve Kerr (1983–88)
 #32 Sean Elliott (1985–89)
 #31 Jason Terry (1995–99)
 #34 Miles Simon (1994–98)

NBA draft picks

McDonald's All-Americans
The following 28 McDonald's All-Americans listed below have signed with Arizona.  An asterisk, "*", Indicates player did not finish his college career at Arizona. A cross, "†", indicates player did not begin his college career at Arizona. 

 
1970–1999
 1984 – Craig McMillan
 1985 – Sean Elliott
 1987 – Brian Williams
 1988 – Chris Mills†
 1990 – Khalid Reeves
 1991 – Ben Davis†
 1996 – Mike Bibby
 1996 – Loren Woods†
 1998 – Richard Jefferson
 1999 – Jason Gardner

2000–2019
 2002 – Hassan Adams
 2003 – Mustafa Shakur
 2004 – Jawann McClellan
 2006 – Chase Budinger
 2007 – Jerryd Bayless
 2012 – Brandon Ashley & Grant Jerrett
 2013 – Rondae Hollis-Jefferson & Aaron Gordon
 2014 – Stanley Johnson
 2015 – Chase Jeter† & Allonzo Trier
 2016 – Kobi Simmons 
 2017 – Deandre Ayton
 2018 – Jordan Brown†
 2019 – Josh Green & Nico Mannion 

2020–present

McDonald's All-American Game MVPs
 2006 – Chase Budinger
 2013 – Aaron Gordon

Olympians
The following Arizona Wildcats men's basketball players have represented their country in basketball in the Summer Olympics:

NBA champions
The following Arizona Wildcats men's basketball players have gone on to win an NBA championship. A Total of 31 NBA championships have been won by 13 former Wildcats players.

Note: *Coach or Assistant coach

Glossary

References